Luke Henri Steyn (born 7 June 1993 in Harare) is a Zimbabwean alpine skier who has competed since 2008. Steyn competed for Zimbabwe at the 2014 Winter Olympics in Sochi, and became the first Winter Olympian to represent the country.

Steyn was born in the country but left at the age of two to Switzerland, where he eventually was exposed to snow and skiing.

See also
 Zimbabwe at the 2014 Winter Olympics

References

External links

1993 births
Living people
Zimbabwean male alpine skiers
Alpine skiers at the 2014 Winter Olympics
Olympic alpine skiers of Zimbabwe
Sportspeople from Harare
White Zimbabwean sportspeople
Zimbabwean expatriate sportspeople in Switzerland
University of Colorado Boulder alumni
People educated at Reed's School